Betty Margaret Kiernan (born 27 August 1955) is an Australian politician. Born in Mount Isa, Queensland, she was an electorate officer and corporate manager before entering politics, and had served on Cloncurry Shire Council from 1981 to 1990. A member of the Labor Party, she was elected to the Legislative Assembly of Queensland in 2006 as the member for Mount Isa.

She lost her seat in the 2012 state election amid Labor's collapse that year, particularly in regional Queensland. She was actually pushed into third place on the primary vote, behind winner Robbie Katter of Katter's Australian Party and the Liberal National candidate.

References

1955 births
Living people
Members of the Queensland Legislative Assembly
North West Queensland
People from Mount Isa
Australian Labor Party members of the Parliament of Queensland
21st-century Australian politicians
21st-century Australian women politicians
Women members of the Queensland Legislative Assembly